is a Japanese anime  production company established in October 2014 by former Fuji TV's Noitamina Executive Editor Kōji Yamamoto.

History
In September 2014, Kōji Yamamoto left Fuji TV after 14 years of working in the company and 10 years as Executive Editor in the late-night anime programming block Noitamina. Two months later, he established Twin Engine to work in the planning and production of anime and to also act as a network of animation studios, both in partnership and ownership.

In November 2015, Yamamoto established Geno Studio with the former Manglobe staff in order to complete the Genocidal Organ film, which was left incomplete due to Manglobe's bankruptcy. In 2016, Twin Engine established Twin Engine Digital Animation Studio, which mostly acts as a sub-contracting studio. Months later, Twin Engine established Relation Inc., a company that mainly deals with advertisement; around the same time, Twin Engine also formed animation studio Revoroot.

Aside from Geno Studio, Revoroot and Studio Colorido, which are subsidiaries of Twin Engine, other studios have also partnered with the company, such as Science Saru, Wit Studio, MAPPA, and Lay-duce, with the latter's CEO also belonging to Twin Engine's board of directors.

Since its establishment, Twin Engine worked in anime mainly with Fuji TV in the Noitamina programming block due to Yamamoto's previous relationship with the company, but since 2018, Twin Engine productions have not been exclusive to the block and have begun to be part of other TV stations.

Works

TV Anime 
Kabaneri of the Iron Fortress (2016) (Chief Producer: Kōji Yamamoto)
Dive!! (2017) (Planning Cooperation)
Kokkoku: Moment by Moment (2018) (Production)
Karakuri Circus (2018–19) (Production)
Dororo (2019) (Production)
Vinland Saga (2019) (Production)
Babylon (2019) (Production)
Pet (2020) (Production)
I-Chu: Halfway Through the Idol (2021) (Production)
Shine On! Bakumatsu Boys  (2022)  (Planning)
Hell's Paradise: Jigokuraku  (TBA)  (Planning Cooperation)

Films 
Typhoon Noruda (2015) (Chief Producer: Kōji Yamamoto)
Genocidal Organ (2017) (Chief Producer: Kōji Yamamoto)
Night Is Short, Walk On Girl (2017) (Chief Producer: Kōji Yamamoto; Planning Cooperation)
Lu over the Wall (2017) (Chief Producer: Kōji Yamamoto; Planning Cooperation)
Penguin Highway (2018) (Chief Producer: Kōji Yamamoto; Planning Cooperation)
A Whisker Away (2020)
Drifting Home (2022)

References

External links 
Twin Engine official website 

Animation studios in Tokyo
Japanese animation studios
Mass media companies established in 2014
Japanese companies established in 2014